The 1976 All-Ireland Senior Club Camogie Championship for the leading clubs in the women's team field sport of camogie was won by St Paul’s from Kilkenny, who defeated Athenry from Galway in the final, played at Nowlan Park.

Arrangements
The championship was organised on the traditional provincial system used in Gaelic Games since the 1880s, with Ahane and Creggan winning the championships of the other two provinces. Carmel Doyle and Ursula Grace scored the vital goals for St Paul’s against Ahane in the semi-final. Athenry travelled by air for their semi-final against Creggan.

The Final
Carmel Doyle doubled on an Angela Downey free for St Pauls’ second goal just before half time to lead 2-2 to 1-1 at half-time and they overcome Athenry’s spirited start to the second half to win. Carmel Doyle scored four goals in all and Angela Downey two.
Agnes Hourigan wrote in the Irish Press: St Paul’s further enhanced their claim to be the outstanding camogie club in the country by winning the All Ireland club championship for the fifth time in just nine seasons. Despite some heavy rain, especially in the second half, the standard of camogie was amazingly high, and the final score did not do justice to the efforts of the youthful Athenry side. By this victory, some ten of the St Paul’s players won their second All-Ireland medal in six months. Liz Neary set a record that is never likely to be surpassed by anyone except herself. She won her sixth All-Ireland club medal, five of them with St Paul’s and one with the Dublin club, Celtic. Many felt that her clubmate Ann Carroll had also had six medals, but Ann missed one of St Paul’s victories in the early years.

Final stages

References

External links
 Camogie Association

1976 in camogie
1976